Wasim Feroze  (born 1 September 1986 in Srinagar) is an Indian footballer who plays as a defender for JK Bank in Jammu and Kashmir.

Career
Waseem who was part of Mohammedan S.C. in 2008-09 I-League was selected by East Bengal in 2009 after his brilliant performance.

Before joining Mohammedan S.C., Waseem was part of JK Bank football team. But he resigned in 2008 and went to Kolkata to play for top football leagues.

Waseem has played in three national school games for his state. In one of the nationals, he captained Jammu and Kashmir team and under his leadership team was able to put on good show.

He started playing club level football from Novelty Sports, where he was taught the basic of the game by international footballer of the Valley, Ishfaq Ahmed. After Novelty, he moved to Food and Supplies team and then to JK SRTC. It was in SRTC, where he came into limelight. The SRTC team was under revival at that period and had started to win most of the championships. Waseem's role was exceptional as defenders always play an important role in win. From SRTC, he moved to JK Bank.

He has played in four Santosh Trophy tournaments at Delhi, Kerala, Haryana and Jammu and Kashmir. Besides, he has participated in number of other national level tournaments.

References

External links
 Profile at Goal.com

Indian footballers
1986 births
Living people
People from Srinagar
Mohammedan SC (Kolkata) players
East Bengal Club players
Footballers from Jammu and Kashmir
Association football defenders